Adamawa State University is located in Mubi, in the Northern Senatorial District of Adamawa State, Nigeria. It was established in 2002 by the Adamawa State University Law No. 10 of 2001. The title caption of the university is "Towards ensuring rapid development and transformation of the State". The current vice chancellor is Kelatapwa Farauta.

List of courses offered in Adamawa State University 

 Accounting
 Agric-Economics and Extension
 Zoology
 Agricultural Science and Education
 Taxation
 Agronomy
 Sociology
 Agriculture
 Pure and Applied Physics
 Animal Production
 Public Administration
 Banking and Finance
 Primary Education Studies
 Biochemistry
 Political Science
 Biology
 Botany
 Physics
 Microbiology
 Business Administration
 Mathematics
 Mass Communication
 Marketing
 Chemistry
 Computer Science
 Computer Science and Mathematics
 Crop Production
 Early Childhood Education
 Economics
 Education and Biology
 Education and Chemistry
 Education and Computer Science
 Education and Economics
 Education and Geography
 Education and Mathematics
 Education and Science
 English Language
 Fisheries and Aquaculture
 Geography
 Geology
 Guidance and Counselling
 History
 Home Economics
 Industrial Chemistry
 Law

References

External links
Adamawa State University Official Website

Universities and colleges in Nigeria
Education in Adamawa State
Educational institutions established in 2002
2002 establishments in Nigeria
Academic libraries in Nigeria